The 2020–21 PGA Tour Latinoamérica was the ninth season of the PGA Tour Latinoamérica, the principal men's professional golf tour in Latin America, operated and run by the PGA Tour.

The season began in early March 2020 at the Estrella del Mar Open in Mexico. Soon after, the schedule was put on hold due to the COVID-19 pandemic, with all tournaments being postponed to mid-May.

With the season remaining suspended, the PGA Tour created an eight tournament LocaliQ Series based in the United States in which tour members, along with members of those of the cancelled 2020 PGA Tour Canada and 2020 PGA Tour China, would be eligible to compete.

On October 1, 2020, the tour announced that the season would resume in December and run through to June 2021.

Schedule
The following table lists official events during the 2020–21 season.

Order of Merit
The Order of Merit was titled as the Points List and was based on prize money won during the season, calculated using a points-based system. The top five players on the tour earned status to play on the 2022 Korn Ferry Tour.

Developmental Series
The following table lists Developmental Series events during the 2020–21 season.

Notes

References

PGA Tour Latinoamérica
PGA Tour Latinoamerica